The Western Province Ice Hockey Association, more commonly known as WP Ice Hockey, is a non-profit organization and member branch of South African Ice Hockey Federation in charge of governing ice hockey at all levels in Western Cape. It comprises 3 ice hockey teams, 110 players, 10 officials.

Executive committee
 Jason Cerff - President
 Salama Khan - Vice President
 Tracy Cerff - General Secretary
 Nasir Khan - Treasurer
 Sharief Kamish - Junior Development
 Steven Johnson - Senior Development
 Dominic Young - Players Rep
 Gillian Swart - Women in Sport
 Marc Giot - Head Coach
 Jonathan Burger - Referee-in-Chief

Leagues
Western Province Ice Hockey U12 League - Under 12's
Western Province Ice Hockey U16 League - Under 16's
Western Province Ice Hockey U20 League - Under 20's
Western Province Ice Hockey Premier League - Senior

Teams
 Cape Town Kings
 Cape Town Penguins
 Cape Town Storm
 Cape Town Griffins (Ladies Team)

References

External links
WP Ice Hockey

Ice hockey in South Africa